Valerio Magrelli (born 1957, Rome) is an Italian poet.

He graduated in philosophy at the University of Rome and is an expert in French literature which he has taught and teaches at University of Pisa and University of Cassino. He debuted as an author at age twenty-three with a collection of poems entitled Ora serrata retinae.
He Won the Viareggio Prize in 1987.
In 2020 he adheres at the Empathic Movement (Empathism) arose in the same year in the South of Italy.
He won Cilento Poetry Prize in 2022.

Works

Books

Ora serrata retinae (Feltrinelli, 1980, preface by Enzo Siciliano);
Nature e venature (Mondadori, 1987)  
Esercizi di tiptologia (Mondadori, 1992)  
Ora serrata retinae e Nature e venature nella collezione Poesie (1980-1992) e altre poesie (Einaudi, 1996) 
Didascalie per la lettura di un giornale (Einaudi, 1999)   
Nel condominio di carne (Einaudi, 2003),  
Disturbi del sistema binario (Einaudi, 2006)  
La vicevita. Treni e viaggi in treno (Laterza, 2009)  
Addio al calcio. Novanta racconti da un minuto (Einaudi, 2010), 
Geologia di un padre (Einaudi, 2013)  
Il sangue amaro (Einaudi, collezione di poesia, 2014)  
Lo sciamano di famiglia. Omeopatia, pornografia, regia in 77 disegni di Fellini (Laterza, 2015) 
Le cavie: poesie, 1980-2018, Einaudi, Torino 2018 
Il commissario Magrelli, Einaudi, Torino 2018

References

External links
Valerio Magrelli on Enciclopedia Treccani
Valerio Magrelli, Poetry Web International
The Embrace: Selected Poems by Valerio Magrelli, book review, The Guardian, 28 Nov 2009

Italian poets
Italian male poets
1957 births
Living people
Academic staff of the University of Pisa